The Even language , also known as Lamut, Ewen, Eben, Orich, Ilqan (earlier also ), is a Tungusic language spoken by the Evens in Siberia. It is spoken by widely scattered communities of reindeer herders from Kamchatka and the Sea of Okhotsk in the east to the Lena river in the west and from the Arctic coast in the north to the Aldan river in the south. Even is an endangered language with only some 5,700 speakers (Russian census, 2010). These speakers are specifically from the Magadan region, the Chukot region and the Koryak region. The dialects are Arman, Indigirka, Kamchatka, Kolyma-Omolon, Okhotsk, Ola, Tompon, Upper Kolyma, Sakkyryr and Lamunkhin.

In the regions where the Evens primarily reside, the Even language is generally taught in pre-school and elementary school alongside the national language, Russian. Where Even functioned primarily as an oral language for communication between reindeer herding brigades, textbooks began circulating throughout these educational institutions from around 1925 to 1995.

The syntax of the Even language follows the nominative case and subject-object-verb (SOV) word order, with the attribute preceding the dependent member.

Language contact
In some remote Arctic villages, such as Russkoye Ustye, whose population descended from Russian-Even intermarriage, the language spoken into the 20th century was a dialect of Russian with a strong Even influence.

Phonology 

Morphology and syntax

Even parts of speech include postpositions, conjunction, particles, and adverbs, as well as nouns and verbs; nouns in Even can function as adjectives and adverbs. Even features a nominative-accusative alignment with subject-object-verb word order. There exists an obligatory copula, but it can be omitted if a noun in the predicate is inflected for the third person. 

Nouns in Even are marked for 13 cases, including the nominative, accusative, dative, lative, two forms of the locative, prolative, three forms of the ablative, instrumental, and comitative. They are also inflected for the singular or plural number and for possession, as well as for the subjective, which indicates that the subject noun has no object. Noun inflection is exclusively suffixing. Its pronouns are distinguished between personal, reflexive, and possessive forms, with a distinction between alienable and inalienable forms.  

Verbs can be conjugated with prefixes for 15 aspects and feature 6 distinctions in voice, with specific negative and interrogative forms. There are 14 ways to form participles, 8 being transgressives.

Orthography

At present, Even writing functions in Cyrillic. There are 3 stages in the history of Even writing:
 until the early 1930s, early attempts to create a written language based on the Cyrillic alphabet;
 1931-1937 - writing on the Latin basis;
 since 1937 - modern writing based on the Cyrillic alphabet.

Modern Even alphabet

Long vowels are indicated by a macron above the corresponding letter.

References

External links

 Endangered Languages of Siberia - The Even Language
 Universal Declaration of Human Rights in Even language
 Vergleich der Reziproken des Ewenischen mit verwandten Sprachen
 

Agglutinative languages
Languages of Russia
Severely endangered languages
Tungusic languages